Platycypha caligata, the dancing jewel, is a species of damselfly in the family Chlorocyphidae. It is found in eastern, central and southern Africa from Ethiopia to Angola and South Africa.  Its natural habitats include shady parts of subtropical or tropical streams and rivers in forest, woodland, savanna, and shrubland, and shorelines of lakes. 

Males perform remarkable territorial and courtship displays which include flashing their brightly coloured legs with flattened tibiae and waving their abdomens.

References

External links

 Platycypha caligata on African Dragonflies and Damselflies Online

Odonata of Africa
Chlorocyphidae
Insects described in 1853
Taxonomy articles created by Polbot